Sinezona confusa is a species of minute sea snail, a marine gastropod mollusk or micromollusk in the family Scissurellidae.

Description
The shell reaches a height of 1.5 mm.

Distribution
This species occurs in the Gulf of Mexico, the Caribbean Sea and in the Atlantic Ocean off Brazil.

References

 Bandel, K. 1998. Scissurellidae als Modell für die Variationsbreite einer natürlichen Einheit der Schlitzbandschnecken (Mollusca, Archaeogastropoda). Mitteilungen aus dem Geologisch-paläontogischen Institut der Universität Hamburg 81: 1–120, 23 pls
 Rosenberg, G., F. Moretzsohn, and E. F. García. 2009. Gastropoda (Mollusca) of the Gulf of Mexico, Pp. 579–699 in Felder, D.L. and D.K. Camp (eds.), Gulf of Mexico–Origins, Waters, and Biota. Biodiversity. Texas A&M Press, College Station, Texas.
 Geiger D.L. & McLean J.H. (2010) New species and records of Scissurellidae and Anatomidae from the Americas (Mollusca: Gastropoda: Vetigastropoda). Zootaxa 2356: 1–35.
 Geiger D.L. (2012) Monograph of the little slit shells. Volume 1. Introduction, Scissurellidae. pp. 1–728. Volume 2. Anatomidae, Larocheidae, Depressizonidae, Sutilizonidae, Temnocinclidae. pp. 729–1291. Santa Barbara Museum of Natural History Monographs Number 7.

Scissurellidae
Gastropods described in 1994